Nuns' Island (officially Île des Sœurs) is an island located in the Saint Lawrence River that forms a part of the city of Montreal, Quebec.  It is part of the borough of Verdun.

History

Originally called Île Saint-Paul in honour of the founder of Montreal, Paul de Chomedey, Sieur de Maisonneuve, the island was initially acquired in 1634 by Jean de Lauzon, future governor of New France. The island was included in the expansive seigneurie of La Citière on the south shore of the St. Lawrence. In 1664 he ceded the island in three equal parts to three prominent citizens of Ville-Marie: Jacques Le Ber, sieur de Saint-Paul et Senneville; Claude Robutel de Saint-André, sieur de La Noue; and Jean de la Vigne, who transferred his portion to Jacques Le Ber's sister Marie in 1668. She, in turn, sold her share to her brother, leaving the island divided between the seigneuries of Saint-Paul and La Noue.

The nuns of the Congrégation de Notre-Dame acquired the seigneurie de La Noue in 1706. Following the British conquest, the other seigneurie was auctioned; the nuns purchased it too in 1769, becoming the sole owners of the island for the next 187 years.  Their ownership would give the island its unofficial name, attested since the early 19th century.

The nuns farmed the island, building houses and agricultural buildings, and later hired women to help with raising livestock. Owing to a dispute between the congregation and the municipality of Verdun over taxes in the late 19th century, the island, which had no fixed link to the Island of Montreal, was made a municipality (L'Île-Saint-Paul) in 1899.

The nuns continued farming until 1956, when they sold the island to the Quebec Home and Mortgage Co. Ltd. In the same year, the provincial government merged it with Verdun. By that time the name Saint-Paul had fallen out of use, and the name île des Sœurs was officialized. The nuns entirely left the island in 1957.

The development of the island began in earnest with the opening of the Champlain Bridge in 1962. The urbanization was carried out by the Metropolitan Structures company of Chicago, under a master plan by the American company of Johnson, Johnson, and Roy. Several master plans were previously drawn up by the architect Harold Ship, but they were never realized. Phase 1 of the master plan was completed in 1968 when the first 3000 inhabitants moved into the first leased 800 units. A second phase, still in accordance with the master plan, was completed the following year, notably including four buildings by Ludwig Mies van der Rohe: three high rise apartment buildings, the first of which, 201 rue Corot, was occupied in 1969, and an Esso filling station of the same vintage.  By the mid-1970s, significant areas to the south of the island were reclaimed from the St. Lawrence and eclectic constructions sprung in various parts of the island. Unsystematic construction has continued rapidly since then. The island was also the filming location for a horror film called They Came from Within''' a.k.a. Shivers'', directed by Canadian filmmaker David Cronenberg in 1975. The island's hotel tower doubled for the film's "Starliner Tower" apartment building.

Geography

The  island is part of the Hochelaga Archipelago in the St. Lawrence River. It is located immediately southeast of the Island of Montreal, from which it is separated by a narrow channel, and north of the La Prairie Bassin.

Soils are mostly of clay loam to clay texture, and usually somewhat poorly drained (MacDonald series). Very poorly drained clay was mapped as Laplaine series, and areas of well-drained glacial till were mapped as Chateaugay clay loam or St. Bernard loam. A small gravel deposit at the northern end was mapped as Ste-Philomène sandy loam.

The island is noted for its parks and scenery including West Vancouver Park which overlooks the Saint Lawrence River. The 26-hectare Domaine Saint-Paul natural woodland in the southern part of the island, a crucial nesting area for more than a hundred species of birds, is one of the last remaining natural woodlands in southern Montreal. It has been progressively eroded by development. The woodland surrounds an artificial lake called Lac des Battures. This lake was actually created by accident as parts of the river known as "water lots" became landlocked during landfill operations in the 1960s and 1970s. Most of this landfill came from the excavation of Montreal's underground Metro system in the mid-1960s. That part of the Island was subject to annual floods caused by spring runoff. The resulting dykes and fill allowed an additional few million square feet to be used for development as well as a golf course.

Government

Nuns' Island is part of the borough of Verdun, making up the neighbourhood of L'Île-des-Sœurs and forming part of the city council district of Champlain–L'Île-des-Sœurs with the eastern third of "mainland" Verdun. As part of Verdun, it is part of the federal riding of Ville-Marie—Le Sud-Ouest—Île-des-Sœurs and the provincial riding of Verdun.

Economy

Commercial services are clustered in malls around the Place du Commerce shopping centre near the Champlain Bridge, with civic services including a community centre and church around Place Elgar.

A recent development is the construction of the campus headquarters of Bell Canada on the northern tip of the island. In 2009 Bell Canada, the largest communications company in Canada, consolidated their workers from several locations throughout Montreal at a new complex on Nuns' Island, which also serves as the national headquarters of the company. The campus consists of a cluster of five low-rise buildings, located at the Autoroute 10 and 15 highway interchange at the northerly end of the island.

A substantial part of Nuns' Island is leased by Structures Metropolitaines from the current landowners of the Island. the Place du Commerce shopping centre

Infrastructure
The Décarie South Expressway (Autoroute 15) runs through Nuns' Island, connecting it to the south bank of the St. Lawrence River via the Champlain Bridge and to the Island of Montreal via the Pont de l'Île-des-Sœurs, part of the Champlain Bridge complex. The Clément Bridge connects the island with the Bonaventure Expressway (Aut. 10).

There are only two schools on the island, École primaire Île-des-Sœurs and École des Marguerite. The primary schools are both part of Montreal's French-language Marguerite-Bourgeoys School Board.

A new rapid transit station (Île-des-Soeurs station) is being constructed, scheduled to open December 1, 2022 on the driverless light rail Réseau express métropolitain line between downtown Montreal and Brossard.

Connecting bus routes

The bus 12 Île-des-Soeurs in the south direction starts its route at De l’Eglise subway station in the borough of Verdun and goes on to Gaétan-Laberge, where is the Verdun hospital and the auditorium of Verdun. After, it goes on highway 15 South and takes the exit #57-S via the Boulevard de l’Île-des-Soeurs, the bus turns right at the first traffic circle to Chemin du Golf. After, the bus continues straight to Boulevard Marguerite-Bourgeoys and the Boulevard de l’Île-des-Soeurs to head to Terminus de la Pointe Sud, which is the terminal of the bus.

It does the same route in the north direction but passes by Place du Commerce and Campus Bell on the Chemin de la Pointe-Nord to reach the highway 15 North.

The 21 Place du Commerce in the south direction starts at LaSalle subway station, also in Verdun and head to Wellington Street. Then, turns right on rue Gilberte-Dubé to reach Boulevard Gaétan-Laberge, which will bring it to highway 15 South. It takes the same exit as the 12, the exit #57-S and turns left at the traffic circle for Place du Commerce and then turns left on Boulevard René-Lévesque (not the same as the downtown street of the same name). After, the bus continues straight at the traffic circle. Then turns left on Chemin de la Pointe-Nord to reach its terminal, Campus Bell.

In the north direction, we can say that it is a shuttle from Campus Bell to LaSalle station, it does not stop between these two stops

The 168 Cité-du-Havre in South direction starts at McGill station in downtown. After, it heads to Square-Victoria-OACI station on the orange line by Côte du Beaver Hall. After, it turns left on Boulevard Robert-Bourassa to reach the Bonaventure Expressway (A-10). Then on the expressway, the bus takes exit #2 to Chemin des Moulins and Avenue Pierre-Dupuy, which is in the Cité-du-Havre and the habitat 67 is located there. After, it comes back on the Bonaventure expressway and gets out via exit #5 to the Nuns’ Island. On the island, the bus turns left at the first traffic circle for Place du Commerce. Then continues on Rue Berlioz and turns left on the Boulevard de l’Île-des-Soeurs to reach the Terminus de la Pointe Sud which is also its terminal.

In North direction it passes on Chemin de la Pointe Sud, Boulevard de l’Île-des-Soeurs, Boulevard Marguerite-Bourgeoys and Chemin du Golf. At the traffic circle, the bus turns right to Boulevard de l’Île-des-Soeurs and at the 2nd traffic circle, the bus will turn left to Boulevard René-Lévesque and head to the traffic circle of the highway 15 North. At this circle, the bus continues straight to Rue Jacques-le-Ber and turns left on Chemin de la Pointe Nord for the Bell campus. It continues after to another traffic circle and takes the exit to Bonaventure expressway. Like in South direction, it gets out at exit #2 for Cité-du-Havre, then comes back on the highway for downtown. After the expressway, the bus stays on Boulevard Robert-Bourassa straight to its terminal, which is Robert-Bourassa/du Président Kennedy, McGill station. The stop in North direction for Square-Victoria-OACI is Robert-Bourassa/de la Gauchetière.

The 178 Pointe-Nord/Île-des-Soeurs is kind of the express of the 168, because it stops less in downtown and does not get off on the expressway. In south direction, the bus starts its route near Lucien l’Allier station on the orange line and the Bell centre. It turns right on Boulevard René-Lévesque (in downtown) and right again on Boulevard Robert-Bourassa and stays on until the Bonaventure Expy. On the Bonaventure Expy, the bus takes directly exit #5 to Nuns’ Island. At the traffic circle, the bus makes a U-turn (takes the 4th exit) to Boulevard de l’Île-des-Soeurs. Then at the traffic circle with Alexander Graham Bell, it takes the exit to Chemin de la Pointe Nord. Then, turns right to Rue Jacques-le-Ber. At the traffic circle, it takes the exit to Boulevard René-Lévesque and turns right on Place du Commerce. At the first traffic circle, it keeps straight to Chemin du Golf. And then on Boulevard Marguerite-Bourgeoys. After, turns left to Boulevard de l’Île-des-Soeurs. The terminal is in front of the primary school, école des Marguerites.

In the north direction, the same route.

See also
 Hochelaga Archipelago
 List of islands of Quebec

References

External links
Bell Campus on Nuns' Island, images
  Construction underway to transform famed Nuns’ Island gas station
  La Station: The jewel in the Nuns' Island crown
L’Île-des-Soeurs's Many Facets

Hochelaga Archipelago
Landforms of Montreal
Neighbourhoods in Montreal
Verdun, Quebec
Quebec populated places on the Saint Lawrence River
River islands of Quebec
Islands of the Saint Lawrence River
Planned communities